Jacobs Well, Jacob's Well, or Jacobswell may refer to:

Structures
Jacob's Well, or the Well of Sychar, a well mentioned in the New Testament and located in the West Bank
Jacob's Well, Bristol, an early mediaeval structure in England that is thought to be a Jewish ritual bath
Jacobs Well, York, a historic building in York, in England

Settlements
 Jacobs Well, Queensland, a suburb in City of Gold Coast, South-East Queensland, Australia
 Jacobs Well, Surrey, a village near Guildford, also called "Jacobswell"

Natural features
Jacob's Well (Texas), a sinkhole and karstic spring located near Wimberley, Texas